Two multi-national companies, Wrigley and Cadbury, together account for some 60% market share of the worldwide chewing gum market. The global market shares for the top five chewing gum companies are estimated to be:

 35% Wrigley Company (US)
 26% Cadbury Trebor Bassett (UK)
 14% Lotte (South Korea + Japan)
 6% Perfetti Van Melle (Italy)
 2% Hershey's (US)

The remaining 17% of the global market is provided by an estimated 200 to 250 smaller gum companies, some of which are listed below.

The worldwide chewing gum industry in 2012 is estimated to be worth $26 billion in sales, and has grown by more than 14% in the last three years.

Chewing gum accounts for 85% of global sales, and bubble gum the other 15%.

History 
1848: John B. Curtis developed "State of Maine Pure Spruce Gum"
1869: [Mexican general, Antonio Lopez de Santa Anna brought Chicle from Mexico to New York]
1872: [Thomas Adams Jr. sold his brand "Adams New York No. 1" with a picture of New York’s City Hall, 2 for a penny]
1875: [Adams add shredded liquorice to his chicle mass and created the first known flavored gum – Adams’ Black Jack gum.]
1880: [William J. White added corn syrup, sugar and flavoring to his "Yucatan" brand]
1881: [Civil War doctor from Cleveland, Ohio, Dr. Edward E. Beeman, added pepsin compound as a digestive aid]
1891: Wrigley Company (US) was established
1895: [Henry Fleer, the brother of Frank H. Fleer, started the brand "Chiclets"]
1899: [1899, William J. White, of Yucatan fame, started the merger of six manufacturers to form the American Chicle Co.]
1899: [Franklin V. Canning developed Dentyne a contraction of “dental hygiene” gum with pink-colored gum with a cinnamon flavor]
189?: [Frank E. Barbour started  Beech-Nut gum] 
1906: [Frank H. Fleer Co., introduced the first bubble gum, Blibber-Blubber.]
1909: [Dr. Louis A. Dreyfus  formed the L.A. Dreyfus company]
1915  Stimorol (Denmark) was established by Dandy
1916: [Franklin V. Canning sold Dentyne trademark and process to the American Chicle Co.]
1916: [Wrigley Co. acquired a controlling interest in the L.A. Dreyfus Co. and, in 1935 became sole owner]
1916: The Hershey Company enters the chewing gum business
1918: NACGM [National Association of Chewing Gum Manufacturers] (US) established 
1919: Ford Gum & Machine (US) established by Ford Mason
 1921: [Clark Chewing Gum Co. of Pittsburgh started Teaberry, Tendermint, and Cinadent brands.]
1921: Leaf Confectionery (US) established
1926: Richardson Brands (US) established
1928: Donruss (US) established
1928: [Walter Diemer, at the Fleer Company, improved the quality of bubble gum "Dubble Bubble"] 
1937: [White Laboratories introduced Aspergum, an analgesic gum. "Pheenamint", a laxative gum and Chooz, an antacid gum containing calcium carbonate.]
1938: Topps (US) established
1946: [Ambrogio and Egidio Perfetti, started Perfetti S.p.A. in Lainate, Italy]
1948: [the Japanese company, Lotte, began chewing gum operations]
1948: [Dr. Bruno Petrulis of Amurol Products Company developed a sugar-free chewing gum.]
1948: Maple Leaf (Holland) established
1949: [Claude E. Parfet formed Krema-Hollywood Chewing Gum in France.]
1953: Topps (US) establishes the Bazooka bubble gum brand
196?: [American Charms Co., Vincent Ciccone, conceived the idea of inserting a bubble gum filling in a ball lollypop named “Blo Pops”]
1962: [American Chicle o. was acquired by the Warner-Lambert Pharmaceutical Co.]
1964: [American Chicle Co. introduced their first sugar-free chewing gum, Trident]
1965: Damel (Spain) established
1971: Proaroma (Brazil) established
1974: [Warner-Lambert launches "Freshen Up" liquid center filled gum.]
1975: Life Savers established Bubble Yum
1977: Bubblicious established
1979: Hubba Bubba established by Wrigley
1979: Bubble Yum launches a sugarless version
1980: Big League Chew launched by Wrigley
1983: Huhtamäki (Finland) creates the Leaf Group gum & candy business through the US acquisitions of Leaf Confectionery, D. L. Clark Company, Richardson Brands and the Donruss division of General Mills
1985: Huhtamäki (Finland) acquires Ford Gum & Machine (US)
1988: Bubble Tape created by Amurol subsidiary of Wrigley
1989: EACGI [European Association of the Chewing Gum Industry] (Belgium) established
1992: Fleer acquired by Marvel Entertainment (comics publisher)
1993: Cadbury (UK) buys its first chewing gum business with the acquisition of Stani (Argentina)
1995: Fleer shuts down its Philadelphia plant and moves its corporate office to suburban Mount Laurel, New Jersey
1996: Topps (US) closes its bubble gum factories in Duryea, Pennsylvania (US) and Innishmore (Ireland) and out-sources its Bazooka bubble gum production to Hersheys (US)
1996: The Hershey Company (US) acquires Leaf's gum brands: Rain-Blo and Super Bubble
1997: Huhtamäki (Finland) acquires the gum business of the Wuxi Leaf joint-venture in China
1998: Huhtamäki (Finland) divests the Leaf (Spain) gum business to Damel
1998: Concord Confections buys Dubble Bubble from Marvel Entertainment and moves operations to suburban Toronto
1999: Zed Gum (Ireland) is established
1999: CSM (Netherlands) buys the Leaf Europe candy and gum business from Huhtamäki (Finland) for €390 million
2000: Cadbury (UK)  buys Kraft's "Hollywood" chewing gum business in France for €185 million
2000: The Hershey Company (US) buys Fruit Stripe and Bubble Yum gum brands and mints from Nabisco (US) 
2000: Cadbury (UK) buys the small Wuxi Leaf gum business in China from Huhtamäki (Finland) for only €3 million
2000: Concord Confections partners with Wal-Mart and Children's Miracle Network to conduct a national bubble-blowing contest across America for children 12 and under (conducted annually until 2006)
2001: Perfetti (Italy) merges with Van Melle (Netherlands)
2002: Cadbury (UK) buys a 51% stake in the gum and candy business of Kent Gida (Turkey) for €110 million
2002: Zed Gum (Ireland) acquires Leaf (Ireland) from CSM and changes name to Zed Candy
2002: Cadbury (UK) buys Dandy's gum brands, mainly in Scandinavia & Russia for €310 million
2003: The Hershey Company (US) sells Fruit Stripe, Rain-Blo and Super Bubble gum brands to Farley & Sathers Candy Co. (US)
2003: Concord Confections (Canada) acquires Philadelphia Chewing Gum (US) and moves production to suburban Toronto
2003: Cadbury (UK) buys the global gum business of the Adams gum division from Pfizer for $4.2 billion
2004: Wrigley Company (US) buys the Joyco gum and candy and Cafosa Gum Base business from Agrolimen (Spain) for $272 million
2004: Tootsie Roll Industries (US) acquires Concord Confections (Canada) for $197 million
2005: ICGA [International Chewing Gum Association] (Belgium) established by the merger of the NACGM and EACGI 
2006: Cadbury (UK) invests €148 million to expand gum capacity in Poland and Mexico
2006: Cadbury (UK) buys the other 49% of Kent Gida (Turkey) for €80 million
2006: Perfetti Van Melle (Italy) buys candy and gum company Chupa Chups (Spain) for an estimated €400 million
2006: ZOFT Gum Company (US) established
2008: [Mars Inc., makers of M&Ms, buys the Wm. Wrigley Jr. Co. and forms Mars-Wrigley]
2009: Vitamin Gum | Vitaball, Inc. (US)
2009:Chicza Organic chewing gum (MEX) launched in the UK and others countries of EU
2011: Ello Gum (US) established
2017: First Energy Holding B.V. (NL) established
2019: QUICK ENERGY Co.Ltd. (Czech Rep) established

See also
Bubble gum
Chewing gum
Functional gum
Gum base
List of chewing gum brands

References

External links
The Story of Gum

Confectionery industry
Chewing gum
Mass production
Industries (economics)